is a railway station located in Edogawa, Tokyo, Japan. It is on the Keisei Electric Railway Main Line.

Layout
This station consists of two side platforms serving two tracks.

Traffic

History
 1912 – The station begins operation as Ichikawa Station
 1914 – The station is renamed to its current name
 17 June 2010 - Station numbering was introduced to all Keisei Line stations; Edogawa was assigned station number KS12.

Notes

References

Railway stations in Japan opened in 1912
Railway stations in Tokyo
Keisei Main Line
Edogawa, Tokyo
1912 establishments in Japan